Meng Ge (born 1966) is the stage name of Liu Qingdi, is a Chinese military singer.

Biography 
Meng Ge was born in Shashi, Hubei province in 1966. At the age of eight, influenced by her mother, she performed her first stage show. She attended the China Conservatory of Music, the Chinese People's Liberation Army Arts College, and the Central Conservatory of Music. After graduating, she joined the Chinese People's Liberation Army Naval Song and Dance Troupe.

Personal life 
In 1990, at the age of twenty-four, she and her professor Li Shuangjiang, twenty-seven years her senior, married in Beijing. They have a son named Li Tianyi.

References

1966 births
Chinese women singers
Living people
People's Liberation Army Arts College alumni